Love Child is a 1982 biopic based on the life of Terry Jean Moore. The film stars Amy Madigan, Beau Bridges, and Mackenzie Phillips.

Plot summary
At 19 Terry Jean Moore was convicted of armed robbery.  Soon after entering prison, she meets a guard named Jack Hansen. The two start an affair, which falls apart after Moore becomes pregnant with his child. As a prisoner, Terry then faces the harsh reality of losing her baby, but fights the system to keep her child.

Cast
Amy Madigan as Terry Jean Moore
Beau Bridges as Jack Hansen
Mackenzie Phillips as J.J.
Albert Salmi as Captain Ellis
Joanna Merlin as Mrs. Sturgis
Margaret Whitton as Jackie Steinberg

Reception
Janet Maslin of The New York Times found the film a stretch: "Larry Peerce, who directed Love Child, tries for as much prison-movie stridency as the material will bear, but his portrait of Terry is so mild that the film's harsher touches seem gratuitous. The periodic cat-fights among the prisoners are certainly nasty, but they don't contribute to any overall continuity. ...Amy Madigan, a newcomer who plays Terry, makes her a raw-boned, angry tomboy at first; only gradually is the child-crying-out-for-help side of the character revealed. Miss Madigan seems potentially a tough, unusual actress, but Mr. Peerce keeps her at full throttle so much of the time that the performance loses its force. Her wildeyed, furious mannerisms, at first quite arresting, become familiar long before they should. Miss Madigan isn't alone in this; all of the film's characters have a tendency to come on too strong and then wear out their welcomes."

Stanley Kauffmann, however, wrote of Madigan's performance: "...I'm saving the best for last... Madigan, freckled, plain but winning, is simultaneously proud and pathetic, intense and vulnerable. A familiar phrase in the literature about acting is the Illusion of the First Time. It's usually applied to dialogue that has been memorized and rehearsed; in Madigan's case, it can be applied to her entire, fundamentally familiar role. She brings us news, human news." And in The Village Voice, Carrie Rickey wrote that "Love Child ... contains one gem: Amy Madigan's raw-nerve performance."

Awards
Nominee New Actress of the Year - Golden Globes (Amy Madigan)

DVD
Love Child was released to DVD by Warner Home Video on June 1, 2010 via the Warner Archive DVD-on-demand service available through Amazon.

References

External links
 
 
 

1982 films
1980s biographical films
American biographical films
1982 drama films
American pregnancy films
1980s prison films
Films directed by Larry Peerce
Films scored by Charles Fox
Warner Bros. films
The Ladd Company films
Films produced by Paul Maslansky
1980s pregnancy films
1980s English-language films
1980s American films